Louis de La Vergne-Montenard de Tressan or Louis III de La Vergne de Tressan ( - ) was a French cleric of the Roman Catholic Church, Archbishop of Rouen (France) from  to .

Biography

He was the second son of Jérémie de Tressan; from what is considered a very old Languedoc family.

His brother was François de La Vergne, Marquess of Tressan.

Louis de La Vergne de Tressan received a licence in theology from the University of Paris.

He was Count of Lyon and Canon of the Saint John the Baptist Lyon Cathedral, then First Almoner of Philippe I, Duke of Orléans. In this capacity he advocated renewed persecution of Huguenots, which became law under Louis Henri, Duke of Bourbon.

His appointed surgeon in Rouen was Claude-Nicolas Le Cat.

References 

1670 births
1733 deaths
Archbishops of Rouen
18th-century French Roman Catholic bishops
Bishops of Nantes